The Mossberg 930 is a 12-gauge semi-automatic shotgun designed by O.F. Mossberg & Sons for use by hunters and skeet-shooters.

Variants
Hunting
Tactical
JM Pro Series
Pro Series Sporting

References

External links
 Mossberg Products Page
 http://www.learnaboutguns.com/2008/10/28/mossberg-930-semi-automatic-shotgun-review/

930
Semi-automatic shotguns of the United States